is a Japanese wrestler. He competed in the men's freestyle welterweight at the 1952 Summer Olympics.

References

External links

1929 births
Possibly living people
Japanese male sport wrestlers
Olympic wrestlers of Japan
Wrestlers at the 1952 Summer Olympics
Place of birth missing (living people)